Dirty White Boy may refer to:

"Dirty White Boy" (song), a song by Foreigner
Dirty White Boy (band), an American glam metal/hard rock band
Tony Anthony (born 1960), American professional wrestler